Guy Bourgouin is a Canadian politician, who was elected to the Legislative Assembly of Ontario in the 2018 provincial election. He represents the riding of Mushkegowuk—James Bay as a member of the Ontario New Democratic Party.

Bourgouin, of Métis background, was born and raised in Dubreuilville, Ontario. At the time of his campaign for election to the legislature, he was president of a United Steelworkers local in Kapuskasing.

He was one of three MPPs of indigenous heritage elected in 2018, alongside NDP caucus colleagues Suze Morrison and Sol Mamakwa.

Electoral record

References

Ontario New Democratic Party MPPs
21st-century Canadian politicians
Living people
People from Kapuskasing
Franco-Ontarian people
Métis politicians
Trade unionists from Ontario
United Steelworkers people
Year of birth missing (living people)